Simon Meredith (born 11 March 1975) is an Australian rules football field umpire in the Australian Football League.  One of the league's most experienced umpires, he has officiated in seven AFL Grand Finals: 2012, 2013, 2014,2016, 2017 and 2020 and 2022.

In June 2014, Meredith suffered severe headaches whilst umpiring a game between Sydney and Port Adelaide. He was taken to hospital and diagnosed with a subarachnoid hemorrhage. He spent over a week in hospital before returning to Melbourne. He recovered fully and went on to umpire in that season's grand final.

In 2016, Meredith umpired the Grand Final between the Western Bulldogs and Sydney Swans.

In 2017, Meredith received AFL life membership after umpiring 300 games, becoming the 22nd umpire to do so. Meredith officiated his 400th match when Fremantle played the Western Bulldogs during Round 12 of the 2021 season. He became the 7th umpire in VFL/AFL history to achieve this feat.

Footnotes

External links

 Simon Meredith at AFL Tables

Australian Football League umpires
1975 births
Living people